Painkillers is the debut studio album by Brian Fallon, singer/guitarist of American rock band The Gaslight Anthem, released on March 11, 2016, through Island Records.

Background
Fallon began writing songs for what would become Painkillers before The Gaslight Anthem's 2014 release, Get Hurt, thinking there would be more time off before Get Hurt. He wrote new material and had some from another band of his, Molly and the Zombies, to use for Painkillers already. When the Get Hurt project started, Fallon put the new songs aside to focus on The Gaslight Anthem, realizing that the new songs he initially thought could be The Gaslight Anthem songs would not fit well with the direction the band was going with for Get Hurt. The band knew there would be a hiatus before it was made public so Fallon began writing more songs and put together a plan for the solo release. Following the announced hiatus of The Gaslight Anthem in July 2015, Fallon entered a Nashville studio to record Painkillers with producer Butch Walker, who also plays guitar on the album. Catherine Popper plays bass and Mark Stepro plays drums on the album.

Promotion
In support of the album, Fallon toured portions of the United States, Canada and Europe throughout 2016. Fallon was accompanied by a full band, including Catherine Popper, The Gaslight Anthem guitarist Alex Rosamilia and The Horrible Crowes guitarist Ian Perkins. The band performed songs from Painkillers and also from Elsie, the album from the other band of Fallon and Perkins, The Horrible Crowes.

Fallon performed "A Wonderful Life" on The Late Show with Stephen Colbert on March 10, 2016. Fallon also performed "A Wonderful Life" on The Daily Show on March 16, 2016.

Singles
The lead single from Painkillers, "A Wonderful Life", was premiered on The Wall Street Journal'''s website on December 10, 2015, a day before its digital release date of December 11, 2015. "A Wonderful Life" was then serviced to alternative radio on January 12, 2016.

Prior to the album's release, four additional songs were released to digital stores and streaming services. The songs were "Nobody Wins" (January 22), "Smoke" (February 5), "Steve McQueen" (February 19) and "Painkillers" (March 4).

Reception

CriticalPainkillers received mostly positive reviews from music critics. At Metacritic, which assigns a normalized rating out of 100 to reviews from mainstream critics, the album has an average score of 78 out of 100, which indicates "generally favorable reviews" based on 17 reviews.

Jonathan Bernstein of Rolling Stone rated the album three and a half stars out of five and writes, "Painkillers isn't quite a rebirth, but with his band struggling to stay vibrant in recent years, it feels a little like a new morning." Writing for Classic Rock, Emma Johnston states "Fallon doesn't really need the backup of a regular band. With this debut he's placed his stake as an American singer-songwriter of style and substance." In a three out of five star rating, Jess Denham of The Independent calls it "solid, genuinely inspired songwriting that The Gaslight Anthem fans will enjoy." Adam Feibel of Exclaim!'' rated the album eight out of ten and writes, "Fallon's songwriting is warm and varied, and there's more soul and character in his voice than ever before."

Commercial
The album debuted at No. 30 on the Billboard 200, and No. 3 on the Top Rock Albums chart, selling 14,000 copies on its first week of release.

Accolades

Track listing
Sources: iTunes and ASCAP

Personnel
Credits adapted from AllMusic

Musicians
 Brian Fallon – bass, guitar, organ, percussion, vocals
 Josh Kaler – pedal steel guitar
 Catherine Popper – bass, background vocals
 Alex Rosamilia – piano
 Mark Stepro – drums, background vocals
 Todd Stopera – guitar
 Butch Walker – banjo, bass, clapping, drums, glockenspiel, guitar, twelve-string acoustic guitar, mandolin, percussion, piano, stomping, background vocals

Technical personnel
 Michael Brauer – mixing
 Matt Burnette-Lemon – package production
 Danny Clinch – photography
 Joe LaPorta – mastering
 David Massey – A&R
 Joe Spix – art direction
 Todd Stopera – engineer
 Butch Walker – engineer, production
 Steve Yegelwel – A&R

Charts

Release history
Source: Amazon.com

References

2016 debut albums
Brian Fallon albums
Albums produced by Butch Walker
Island Records albums